"The Star Thrower" (or "starfish story") is part of a 16-page essay of the same name by Loren Eiseley (1907–1977), published in 1969 in The Unexpected Universe. The Star Thrower is also the title of a 1978 anthology of Eiseley's works (including the essay), which he completed shortly before his death.

The original story
The story describes the narrator walking along the beach early one morning in the pre-dawn twilight, when he sees a man picking up a starfish off the sand and throwing it into the sea. The narrator is observant and subtle, but skeptical; he has seen many "collectors" on the beach, killing countless sea creatures for their shells.  Some excerpts:

 

Later, after some thoughts on our relationships to other animals and to the universe, the narrator returns to the beach:

..."On a point of land, I found the star thrower...I spoke once briefly.  "I understand," I said.  "Call me another thrower."  Only then I allowed myself to think, He is not alone any longer.  After us, there will be others...Perhaps far outward on the rim of space a genuine star was similarly seized and flung...For a moment, we cast on an infinite beach together beside an unknown hurler of suns... We had lost our way, I thought, but we had kept, some of us, the memory of the perfect circle of compassion from life to death and back to life again." (The Star Thrower, p.181)

The story as adapted 
The story has been adapted and retold by motivational speakers and on internet sites, often without attribution, since at least the mid-1980s. In this version the conversation is related between other characters, an older man and a younger one, a wise man and a little girl, or Jesus and a man.

It appears unattributed in a 1991 novel by Dan Millman, in which a spiritual seeker asks his wise teacher, "[t]here are so many – how can [throwing each starfish back in the water] make any difference?" She replies, "It makes a difference to this one."

It was also adapted into a children's story in 2006. Called, "Sara and the Starfish," it re-tells the story from the eyes of a young girl as well as the starfish itself, though the moral of the story is the same as the original idea told by Eiseley.

The story is referenced in the novel The Marriage Pact by Michelle Richmond.

Publication data
The Unexpected Universe (1969, Harcourt, Brace and World )
Survival Printout (1973, Vintage Books )
The Star Thrower (1978, Times Books (Random House) hardcover: , 1979 Harvest/HBJ paperback: ,); introduction by W. H. Auden

References

External links
Joel Barker's version of "The Star Thrower"

1978 books
Parables
Traditional stories